Buryat Opera and Ballet Theatre (officially known as the "G. Tsydynzhapov Buryat State Academic Opera and Ballet Theatre") is a music theatre in Ulan-Ude, the capital of the Buryat Republic, Russia. It operates its own music school, a dance school, and an art institute. The theatre opened in 1939. It is named after Buryat drama actor and director  Gombozhap Tsydynzhapov (ru).

References

External links

Theatres in Ulan-Ude
Theatres completed in 1939
1939 establishments in Russia
Cultural heritage monuments of federal significance in Buryatia